Horní Lideč is a municipality and village in Vsetín District in the Zlín Region of the Czech Republic. It has about 1,300 inhabitants.

Twin towns – sister cities

Horní Lideč is twinned with:
 Dohňany, Slovakia

References

External links

  

Villages in Vsetín District